The String Quartet No. 3, Op. 39, by Henrique Oswald was composed in 1908. It is dedicated to Antônio Francisco Braga.

Structure 
The quartet is in 3 movements:
I. Allegro agitato
II. Andante con moto
III. Allegro moderato

Recordings 
 (2010/2011) Henrique Oswald: Música de câmara (Integral dos quartetos de cordas; Integral dos quartetos com piano; Quinteto com piano Op. 18; Trio com piano Op. 45; Sonata-Fantasia Op. 44; Elegia para cello e piano) – ArsBrasil (violin: Artur Roberto Huf, Samuel Lima; viola: André Rodrigues, Valdeci Merquiori; cello: Gêneses Oliveira, Mauro Brucoli, Renato Oliveira), Fernando Lopes (piano) – Ariah Cultural  (3 CDs)

References

Sources 
 

Compositions by Henrique Oswald
Oswald, Henrique
1908 compositions